Ruslan Yudenkov (born 28 April 1987) is a Belarusian footballer playing currently for Maktaaral.

International career
He made his debut for the Belarus national football team on 8 October 2021 in a World Cup qualifier against Estonia.

Honours
Gomel
Belarusian Cup: 2010–11, 2021–22

References

External links
 
 
 Profile at FC Gomel website

1987 births
Living people
Sportspeople from Gomel
Belarusian footballers
Association football midfielders
Belarus international footballers
Belarusian expatriate footballers
Expatriate footballers in Kazakhstan
FC Dnepr Mogilev players
FC Gomel players
FC Slavia Mozyr players
FC Rechitsa-2014 players
FC Spartak Shklov players
FC Granit Mikashevichi players
FC Gorodeya players
FC Maktaaral players